Marinula filholi is a species of small air-breathing land snail, a terrestrial pulmonate gastropod mollusc in the family Ellobiidae; found in New Zealand.

References

 Powell A. W. B., New Zealand Mollusca, William Collins Publishers Ltd, Auckland, New Zealand 1979 

Ellobiidae
Gastropods of New Zealand
Gastropods described in 1854